The House of Sickingen is an old southwest German noble family. The lords of Sickingen belonged to the Kraichgau nobility and from 1797 to the Imperial nobility. Significant relatives emerged from the family, who achieved great influence in both spiritual and secular offices. Reinhard von Sickingen was Prince-Bishop of Worms from 1445 to 1482 and Kasimir Anton von Sickingen was Prince-Bishop of Constance from 1743 to 1750. Imperial Knight Franz von Sickingen (1481-1523) was leader of the Rhenish and Swabian knighthood.

The Sickingen-Sickingen line of the family died out in 1834, the Sickingen-Hohenburgs in 1932.

Lordship of Landstuhl 
The Lordship of Landstuhl was a knightly territory of the Holy Roman Empire of the German Nation in today's Rhineland-Palatinate. Feuded by the Lords of Sickingen from the 16th to the 18th century, it fell to France along with the left bank of the Rhine in 1801 and became part of the Kingdom of Bavaria in 1816. The lordship was divided into the "Great Jurisdiction" (Großgericht) and the "Little Jurisdiction" (Kleingericht). Within the Großgericht were the villages of Bann, Harsberg, Hermersberg, Horbach, Kindsbach, Krickenbach, Linden, Queidersbach, Weselberg and Zeselberg. The Kleingericht oversaw the villages of Gerhardsbrunn, Hauptstuhl, Kirchenarnbach, Knopp, Langwieden, Martinshöhe, Mittelbrunn, Mühlbach, Oberarnbach, Obernheim, Scharrhof and Schauerberg,

Members 
 Schwickart der Jüngere von Sickingen (died 1478), Amtmann
 Schweickhardt von Sickingen (died 1505), imperial knight, father of Franz von Sickingen
 Reinhard von Sickingen (born around 1417; died 1482), Prince-Bishop of Worms, held office from 1445 to 1482
 Franz von Sickingen (born 1481; died 1523), imperial knight and leader of the Rhenish and Swabian knights
 Johann Damian von Sickingen (18th century), Inhaber of an imperial infantry regiment
 Ferdinand Damian von Sickingen, Commander of the German Order of St. Aegidius, (1734-1736)
 Karl Heinrich Joseph von Sickingen (born 1737; died 1791), diplomat and chemist
 Karl Schweikard von Sickingen (died 1711), Knight of the Teutonic Order
 Kasimir Anton von Sickingen (born 1684; died 1750), Prince-Bishop of Constance, held office from 1743 to 1750
 Karl Ludwig von Sickingen-Ebernburg, Abbot of Kornelimünster Abbey 1745–1764
 Franz von Sickingen (died 1834 in Sauerthal), imperial count and castle lord of the Sauerburg. Last member of the noble family

Variant arms 
Colours and elements from the Sickingen coat of arms still appear today in many county, town and village coats of arms in the former territory of the Sickingens.

References

Further reading 

 Hans-Joachim Bechtoldt: Wappensiegel der Sickinger. In: Jahrbuch für westdeutsche Landesgeschichte, 34th Yearbook, 2008, pp. 129–167 [not evaluated]
 Michael Benz: Sickingen – Bildnisse. G. Peschke GmbH Druckerei, Munich, 1985 [not evaluated]
 Joachim P. Heinz: Der Reichsdeputationshauptschluss (1803) und die Auflösung der pfälzischen Grafschaften Wartenberg, Sickingen und von der Leyen. In: Mitteilungen of the Historischen Vereins der Pfalz, 111. Vol., 2013, pp. 185–265 [not evaluated]
 Otto Hupp: Münchener Kalender 1903. Buch u. Kunstdruckerei AG, Munich / Regensburg, 1903.
 Ernst Heinrich Kneschke: Neues allgemeines deutsches Adels-Lexicon. Vol. 8, Friedrich Voigt's Buchhandlung, Leipzig, 1868, pages 485–486. (digitalised)
 Genealogisches Handbuch des Adels, Adelslexikon Vol. XIII, Vol. 128 of the complete series, C. A. Starke Verlag, Limburg (Lahn), 2002,

External links 

 

 
1280s establishments in the Holy Roman Empire
1932 disestablishments in Austria
Christian families
Extinct baronies
Palatinate noble families